Sant Blanc is a family owned watch and jewelry company founded in 1779 by Gaston Sant Blanc.  Sant Blanc sells jewelry and luxury wristwatches to an international market.

History 
In 1779, a self-educated French clockmaker and mathematician Gaston Sant Blanc crafted a complicated clock movement in Paris, France.  Sant Blanc continued his work in Paris where he crafted innovative micro movements and complicated pocket watches.  In 1895 his grandson Herschel Gaston Sant Blanc, a master watchmaker, continued development of complications in period micro sized movement pocket watches, always endeavoring to craft smaller, more accurate time keepers.  In 1899, Sant Blanc introduced a wristwatch for ladies.  The delicate sized wrist watch was Parisian high fashion.  The stylish, all gold, ladies time keeper on a bracelet was designed and made entirely by the Sant Blanc family.  While most French watchmakers relocated to Switzerland, the Sant Blanc family remained in Paris a family owned firm.  Sant Blanc continued to develop cutting edge timepieces, complicated movement wristwatches, clocks, and fine, luxury jewelry.  In 1999, Sant Blanc began to offer fine, luxury Swiss made watches and timepieces on the internet.  Today, Sant Blanc is headquartered in the United States and led by Sant Blanc's great grandson Mr. Jon Todd.

In  2002, Jon Todd assisted John Brozek  with his book, "The Rolex Report: An Unauthorized Reference Book For The Rolex Enthusiast", by supplying authentic Rolex watch photos to be used.  A special entry was made in the book to recognize Mr. Todd for the photos.  Also, most of the modern Rolex watch models were supplied by Sant Blanc and noted with the note "Courtesy of generalwar.com"  "Generalwar" is the name of the Sant Blanc eBay store and stands for "General Watches, Accessories and Restoration".

References

External links
 

High fashion brands
Jewelry retailers of the United States
Luxury brands